The Chevrolet "big block" engine is a term for a series of large-displacement, naturally-aspirated, 90°, overhead valve, gasoline-powered, V-8 engines; that were developed and produced by the Chevrolet Division of General Motors, from the 1950s until present.

Chevrolet had introduced its popular small block V8 in 1955, but needed something larger to power its medium duty trucks and the heavier cars that were on the drawing board.

W-series (Mark I)
The first version of the "Big Block" V8 Chevrolet engine, known as the W-series, was introduced in 1958. Chevrolet designed this engine for use in passenger cars and light trucks. This engine had an overhead valve design with offset valves and uniquely scalloped rocker covers, giving it a distinctive appearance. The W-series was produced from 1958 to 1965, and had three displacement options:
 , available from 1958 to 1961 in cars, and in light trucks through 1964;
 , available from 1961 to 1965; and
 , available in 1962 and 1963.

The W-series engine was made of cast iron. The engine block had  bore centers, two-bolt main bearing caps, a "side oiling" lubrication system (the main oil gallery located low on the driver's side of the crankcase), with full-flow oil filter, and interchangeable cylinder heads. Heads used on the high performance 409 and 427 engines had larger ports and valves than those used on the 348 and the base 409 passenger car and truck engines, but externally were identical to the standard units - but for the location of the engine oil dipstick, on the driver's side on the 348 and the passenger's on the 409/427. No satisfactory explanation was ever offered for why this change was made, but it did provide a reliable means of distinguishing a 348 from the larger engines.

As with the  "Small Block" engines, the W-series valve gear consisted of tubular steel pushrods operating stud-mounted, stamped-steel rocker arms. The push rods also acted as conduits for oil flow to the valve gear. Due to the relatively low mass of the valve train, mechanical lifter versions of the W-series engine were capable of operating at speeds well beyond 6000 RPM.

The combustion chamber of the W-series engine was in the upper part of the cylinder, not the head, the head having only tiny recesses for the valves. This arrangement was achieved by combining a cylinder head deck that was not perpendicular to the bore with a crowned piston, which was a novel concept in American production engines of the day. As the piston approached top dead center, the angle of the crown combined with that of the head deck to form a wedge-shaped combustion chamber with a pronounced quench area. The spark plugs were inserted vertically into the quench area, which helped to produce a rapidly moving flame front for more complete combustion.

The theory behind this sort of arrangement is that maximum brake mean effective pressure (BMEP) is developed at relatively low engine speeds, resulting in an engine with a broad torque curve. With its relatively flat torque characteristics, the "W" engine was well-suited to propelling both the trucks and heavier cars that were in vogue in the US at the time. The W-series was a physically massive engine when compared to the "Small Block" Chevrolet engine. Compared to the 283 "Small Block," it measured 1.5 inches longer, 2.6 inches wider, and 0.84 inches less tall.

General Motors engineers explained, in 1959, reasons behind the combustion-in-block setup. Anticipating varied future compression ratios in future auto and truck use: "It was obvious that with the combustion chamber placed within the cylinder head, the foundry must retool every time a compression change is in order. The necessity of making special heads to provide a range of compression ratios and to permit attachment of accessory mountings for the various model applications is of serious concern to the manufacturing and service departments....Inclining the top of the block to 16 deg and shaping the top of the piston like a gabled roof with a 16-deg angle resulted in a 32-deg wedge-shaped combustion space....The addition of two milled cutouts [in the head] to extend the volume of the combustion wedge can create a compression ratio of 7.5/1; one milled cutout produces a 9.5/1 compression ratio. The difference between the volume of these cutouts provides a wide compression range without making any changes in the piston or cylinder head. The number or size of cutouts is varied simply by adding or removing cutters."

348
The first iteration of the W-series engine was the 1958 "Turbo-Thrust" , originally intended for use in Chevrolet trucks but also introduced in the larger, heavier 1958 passenger car line. It was produced through 1964 for use in large Chevrolet trucks.

With a four-barrel carburetor, the base Turbo-Thrust produced . A special "Tri power" triple-two-barrel version, called the "Super Turbo-Thrust", produced .

409
A  version was Chevrolet's top regular production engine from 1961 to 1965, with a choice of single or 2X4-barrel Rochester carburetors. On December 17, 1960, the 409 engine was announced along with the Impala SS (Super Sport) model. The initial version of the engine produced  with a single 4-barrel Carter AFB carburetor. A  version of this engine was also available, developing 1 hp per cubic inch with a dual four-barrel aluminium intake manifold and two Carter AFB carburetors. It had a forged steel crankshaft. This dual-quad version was immortalized in the Beach Boys song titled "409".

In the 1963 model year, output reached  @ 6000 rpm and  @ 4200 rpm of torque with the Rochester 2X4-barrel carburetor setup, a compression ratio of 11:1 and a solid lifter camshaft. The engine was available through mid-1965, when it was replaced by the   Mark IV big-block engine. In addition, a  version of the 409 engine was available from 1963 to 1965, with a single 4-barrel cast iron intake mounting a Rochester 4GC square-bore carburetor, and a hydraulic-lifter camshaft.

427 (Z11)
A special  version of the 409 engine was used in the 1963 Impala Sport Coupé, ordered under Chevrolet Regular Production Option (RPO) Z11. This was a special package created for drag racers, as well as NASCAR, and it consisted of a  engine with aluminium body parts, and a cowl-induction air intake system. The aluminium body parts were fabricated in Flint, Michigan at the facility now known as GM Flint Metal Center. Unlike the later, second-generation 427, it was based on the W-series 409 engine, but with a longer  stroke. Fifty RPO Z11 cars were produced at the Flint GM plant.

Extant GM Documents show 50 Z11 engines were built at the GM Tonawanda Engine plant for auto production, and 20 partial engines were made for replacement/over-the-counter use. Unfortunately, there is no evidence from GM that shows 57 cars were built.

Mark II
The so-called Mystery Motor, known internally as the Mark II or Mark IIS, is a race-only engine produced for the 1963 season. Development began with a  version (Mark II) and ended with a  variant; however only the  engine (Mark IIS) was ever raced. It gained its nickname due to the incredible speeds cars equipped with it attained during its debut, being considerably faster than the well known W-series powered cars. The engine was first used in Mickey Thompson's Z-06 Corvettes at Daytona in the 1963 Daytona 250 Miles – American Challenge Cup, and then in 1963 Daytona 500 where the number 13 car, driven by Johnny Rutherford, finished four laps down (in ninth place), with the top five cars being the heavier 1963 Ford Galaxie 500's. This "secret" engine was a unique design incorporating aspects of both the W-series and the mid-1965 introduced Mark IV, referred to in sales literature as the "Turbo-Jet V8".

Richard Keinath, the original Mark II and IV design engineer stated that the MK III was a regular MK II design with a larger bore, but the Tonowanda plant didn't want to cast a block with a bore that large. The Packard rumor was just that, a rumor.

Mark III
Packard's V8-engine tooling and production rights were considered for purchase by Chevrolet. Project did not proceed.

The Mark III was supposed to be a Mark II with bigger bore centers, but it never left the drawing board due to high tooling costs.

Mark IV
The Mark IV differed from the W-series engine in the placement of the valves and the shape of the combustion chambers. Gone was the chamber-in-block design of the W-series engine (which caused the power curve to drastically dip above 6500 rpm), and in its place was a more conventional wedge chamber in the cylinder head, which was now attached to a conventional 90 degree deck. The valves continued to use the displaced arrangement of the W-series engine, but were also inclined so that they would open away from the combustion chamber and cylinder walls, a design feature made possible by Chevrolet's stud mounted rocker arms. This alteration in valve placement resulted in a significant improvement in volumetric efficiency at high RPM and a substantial increase in power output at racing speeds. Owing to the appearance of the compound angularity of the valves, the automotive press dubbed the engine the "porcupine" design.

As part of the head redesign, the spark plugs were relocated so that they entered the combustion chamber at an angle relative to the cylinder centerline, rather than the straight-in relationship of the W-series engine. This too helped high RPM performance. Due to the new spark plug angle, the clearance provided by the distinctive scalloped valve covers of the W-series was no longer needed, and wide, rectangular covers were used.

Aside from the new cylinder head design and the reversion to a conventional 90 degree cylinder head deck angle, the Mark IV shared many dimensional and mechanical design features with the W-series engine. Like its predecessor, the Mark IV used crowned pistons, which were castings for conventional models and impact extruded (forged), solid skirt types in high performance applications.

Also retained from the W-series design were the race-proven Moraine M400 aluminum bearings first used in the 409, as well as the highly efficient "side oiling" lubrication system, which assured maximum oil flow to the main and connecting rod bearings at all times. Later blocks intended for performance use had the main oil gallery moved up to the cam bearing bore area and provided "priority main" oiling, improving the oil system even further.

366
The  Big Block V-8 gasoline engine was used in Chevrolet medium duty trucks, school buses and police sedans. This engine was made from the 1960s until 2004.The 366 used 4 rings on the pistons, as it was designed from the very beginning as a truck engine. The 366 was produced only as a tall-deck engine, with a deck  taller than the 396, 402, and 454 short-deck Big Blocks.

396 and 402
The  V8 was introduced in the 1965 Corvette as the L78 option and in the Z16 Chevelle as the L37 option.

Despite being  larger, Chevrolet continued marketing it under the popular "396" label in the smaller cars while at the same time labeling it "Turbo-Jet 400" in the full-size cars.

Power rating(s) by year:
 1965: //
 1966: //
 1967: //
 1968: //
 1969: (2bbl)///
 1970: /
 1972:  SAE net for dual exhaust and  SAE net for single exhaust

Used in:
 1965 Chevrolet Corvette
 1965–1972 Chevrolet Chevelle
 1967–1972 Chevrolet Camaro
 1968–1970 Chevrolet Nova
 1970–1972 Chevrolet Monte Carlo, Chevrolet El Camino, GMC Sprint, Chevrolet trucks
 1965–1972 Chevrolet Biscayne, Chevrolet Bel Air, Chevrolet Impala, Chevrolet Impala SS, Chevrolet Caprice

396 and 402 Production codes
396
 L-34:  produced 1966–9, 10.25:1 compression, Holley (Q-jet 1968–1969) carburetor, hydraulic lifters, oval port closed chamber heads, forged steel crankshaft, and two-bolt main caps. It produced .
 L-35:  produced 1965–9, had 10.25:1 compression, Q-jet carburetor, forged steel (1965-1967) or nodular iron (1968-9) crankshaft, hydraulic lifters, oval port closed chamber heads, and two-bolt main caps. It produced .
 L-37: produced 1965 similar to L-78 except for having hydraulic lifters and slightly milder cam; 2-bolt main caps; designed specifically for the 1965 Z16 Chevelle
 L-66: produced 1969, rare two-barrel carburetor, 9:1 compression, nodular iron crankshaft, hydraulic lifters, oval port closed chamber heads, and two-bolt main caps. It produced .
 L-78: produced 1965–9, had a Holley  carburetor, compression ratio 11:1, forged pop-top pistons, aluminium high-rise intake manifold, steel crankshaft, solid lifter cam (same as the L-72), rectangular ("square") port closed chamber heads, and four-bolt main caps. It produced  in mid-size cars,  in Corvettes.

402
 LS-3:  produced 1970–2, 10.25:1 (1970) or 8.5:1 (1971) compression, hydraulic lifters, nodular iron crankshaft, and two-bolt main caps. It produced  (1970),  (1971),  (1972 net horsepower, single or dual exhaust).
 L-34:  produced 1970. Same as  L-34 from 1967 to 1969.
 L-78:  produced 1970. Same as  L-78 from 1966 to 1969.

427

The highly successful and versatile  version of the Mark IV engine was introduced in 1966 as a production engine option for full-sized Chevrolets and Corvettes. There were smooth running versions with hydraulic lifters suitable for powering the family station wagon, as well as rough-idling, high-revving solid lifter models usually applied to a minimally equipped, plain-looking, two-door Biscayne sedan fitted with the  version of the 427 - (RPO L72).

This engine was identical to the  L72 427 (first introduced in 1966), but was fitted with 3X2-barrel Holley carburetors, known as "Tri-Power", in lieu of the L72's single 4-barrel carburetor. Both engines used the same high-lift, long-duration, high-overlap camshaft and large-port, cast-iron heads to maximize cylinder head airflow (and, hence, engine power) at elevated engine-operating speeds. Consequently, the engines offered very similar performance and resulted in a car whose performance was described by one automotive journalist as "the ultimate in sheer neck-snapping overkill".

In 2011, Super Chevy Magazine conducted a chassis dynamometer test of a well documented, production-line, stock but well-tuned L-72 "COPO" Camaro, and recorded a peak  at the rear wheels, demonstrating the substantial difference between 1960s-era SAE "gross" horsepower ratings and horsepower at the wheels on a chassis dynomometer. Wheel horsepower (which is obtained at the drive wheels and thus takes into account drivetrain power loss) does not equate to SAE net HP (which is horsepower at the flywheel, like SAE gross, but with all accessories included, unlike SAE gross).

The RPO L89 was an L71 fitted with aluminum heads. This resulted in superior vehicle weight distribution for improved handling, although the difference in straight line performance was negligible.

ZL1
The 1969 ZL1 version of the 427 engine was developed primarily for Can-Am racing, where it was very successful in cars like the McLaren M8B. The ZL1 specifications were nearly identical to the production L88 version of the 427, but featured an all-aluminum cylinder block, in addition to aluminum cylinder heads,  The first Corvette with the RPO ZL1 engine package was built in early December 1968 and featured aluminum closed chamber heads shared with the L88. Both L88 and ZL1 optioned cars continued to be built with closed chamber heads until approximately March 1969, when the open combustion chamber aluminum heads finally were in production and began being fitted to the L88 and ZL1 engines. The ZL1 engine also featured a lightweight aluminum water pump, a camshaft that was slightly "hotter" than the L88's, and a specially tuned aluminum intake manifold. Like the L88, the ZL1 required 103 octane (RON) (minimum) fuel, used an unshrouded radiator, and had poor low-speed idle qualities - all of which made the two engines largely unsuitable for street use. (102 octane RON [Sunoco 260] represented the highest octane gasoline sold at common retail stations.)

As impressive as the ZL1 was in its day, actual engine dyno tests of a certified production line stock ZL1 revealed  SAE net with output swelling to  SAE gross with the help of optimal carb and ignition tuning, open long tube racing headers, and with no power-sapping engine accessories or air cleaner in place.  A second engine dyno test conducted on a second production line stock (but recently rebuilt and partially blueprinted) ZL1 revealed nearly identical figures for the various "gross" conditions.

Period magazine tests of the ZL1 were quite rare due to the rarity of the engine itself. High-Performance Cars tested a production line stock, but well tuned, example and recorded a 13.1 second/ , which correlates quite well with the previously referenced  SAE Net figure. Super Stock and Drag Racing Magazine recorded an 11.62 second/  in a ZL1 Camaro that was professionally tuned and driven by drag racing legend Dick Harrell, although that car was also equipped with open long-tube S&S equal-length headers, drag slicks, and minor suspension modifications. This large difference in power suggests that the OEM exhaust manifolds and exhaust system were highly restrictive in the ZL1 application, as was also the case with the similar L88.

The $4,718 cost of the ZL1 option doubled the price of the 1969 Corvette, but resulted in a car with exceptional performance for its day. Just two production Corvettes (factory option at dealer) and 69 Camaros (non-dealer option from factory - COPO 9560) were built with the ZL1.

Chevrolet capitalized on the versatility of the 427 design by producing a wide variety of high-performance, "over-the-counter" engine components as well as ready-to-race "replacement" engines in shipping crates. Some of the components were developed to enhance the engine's reliability during high RPM operation, possibly justifying the use of the description "heavy duty." However, most of these items were racing parts originally designed for Can-Am competition that found their way onto dealers' shelves, and were meant to boost the engine's power output.

Beginning in 1969, the highest performance 427 models were fitted with the new open (vs. closed) chamber cylinder heads, along with design improvements in crankshafts, connecting rods, and pistons, adopted from the Can-Am development program.

427 performance specs

Notes:
 1966–1969 Chevrolet Biscayne
 1966–1969 Chevrolet Caprice
 1966–1969 Chevrolet Impala
 1966–1969 Chevrolet Corvette
 1968–1969 Chevrolet Camaro (most were dealer installed, but in 1969 both the L-72 and the ZL-1 were factory options)

427 Production codes
 LS-1:  produced 1969, 10.25:1 compression, Q-jet carburetor, oval port closed chamber heads, hydraulic lifters, nodular iron crankshaft, and two-bolt main caps. It produced .
 L-36:  produced 1966–9, had 10.25:1 compression, Holley or Q-jet carburetor, nodular iron crankshaft, hydraulic lifters, oval port closed chamber heads, and two-bolt main caps. It produced  in 1967–68 full-size cars,  in 1969 full-size cars and Corvettes (by exhaust system).
 L-68:  produced 1967–9, had 10.25:1 compression, Tri-Power, nodular iron crankshaft, hydraulic lifters, aluminium oval port closed chamber heads, and two-bolt main caps. It produced , and was used in Corvettes.

454

Indeed, Super Chevy Magazine conducted a chassis dyno test of a well-documented, well tuned, but stock 1970 LS-6 Chevelle and recorded 283 peak HP at the wheels – a figure that lines up quite well with the previously referenced 350 SAE Net HP figure.

Several LS-7 intake manifolds were individually produced and sold to the general public by a few Chevrolet dealers as optional performance parts. The LS-7 was later offered as a crate engine from Chevrolet Performance with an officially rated power minimum of  gross.

Hardened valve seats further increased reliability and helped allow these engines to last much longer than the earlier versions, even without the protection previously provided by leaded fuel. 1974 was the last year of the 454 in the Corvette, although the Chevelle offered it in the first half of the 1975 model year. It was also available in the full size Impala/Caprice through model year 1976.
 1970–1976 Chevrolet Caprice
 1970–1975 Chevrolet Chevelle
 1970–1975 Chevrolet Monte Carlo
 1970–1975 Chevrolet El Camino
 1971–1975 GMC Sprint
 1970–1974 Chevrolet Corvette

L19
General Motors introduced EFI in 1987, which was found on GM C1500 SS, C/K2500 and C/K3500 trucks. The 1991 through 1993 454SS made 255 HP at 4000 TPM and 405 TQ at 2400 RPM thanks to dual 2.5" catalytic converters. All other versions, including the 1990 SS, made 230 HP at 3600 RPM and 385 TQ at 1600 RPM through a single 3" catalytic converter. Easily verified through GM Heritage Center website. 
 1987-1990 Chevrolet C/K
 1987 GMC Suncrest

Commercial applications
Mark IV engines saw extensive application in Chevrolet and GMC medium duty trucks, as well as in Blue Bird Corporation's All American and TC/2000 transit buses (the latter up until 1995, using a 427 with purpose-built carburetor). In addition to the 427, a  version was produced for the commercial market. Both the 366 and 427 commercial versions were built with a raised-deck, four-bolt main bearing cap cylinder to accommodate an extra oil control ring on the pistons. Unfortunately, the raised deck design complicated the use of the block in racing applications, as standard intake manifolds required spacers for proper fit. Distributors with adjustable collars that allowed adjustments to the length of the distributor shaft also had to be used with 366 and 427 truck blocks.

Mark IV engines also found themselves widely used in power boats. Many of these engines were ordinary Chevrolet production models that were fitted with the necessary accessories and drive system to adapt them to marine propulsion. Mercury Marine, in particular, was a major user of the Mark IV in marine drives, and relabeled the engines with their corporate logo.

Generation V
For 1991 General Motors made significant changes to the Big-Block resulting in the Generation V. The block received a one-piece rear seal and all blocks received 4-bolt mains. Additionally the main oil galley was moved from near the oil pan to near the camshaft. Also the valvetrain became non-adjustable and the provisions for a mechanical fuel pump were eliminated. Cast aluminium rocker covers were fitted in place of stamped steel covers, featuring a screw-in filler cap. Structural changes were carried out to the cylinder case to improve the integrity of the bores and the inlet manifold was changed to a single-piece design.

6.0 (L50)
The  truck engine also received the Mark V updates for 1991.

L19
From 1991 the 454 was updated to the new Gen V block, crankshaft and heads. This engine was rated at 230 net hp, 380 ft lbs net torque, and was discontinued after 1995, GM coming out with the Vortec 7400 in 1996.

502

The "Ram Jet 502", the  /  crate motor, was offered with fuel injection, and came as a turn key setup which included all the wiring and electronics needed to operate in any vehicle. It was also used in marine applications.

ZZ572
General Motors began offering a newly developed  in 1998 to the aftermarket via its GM Performance Parts division. The 572 is officially offered by Chevrolet for the 2022 model year COPO Camaro.

ZZ632
In 2021, Chevrolet Performance presented the largest and most powerful crate engine in the brand's history — the ZZ632/1000 crate engine. The motor itself weighs .

According to Russ O’Blenes, the GM director of the Performance and Racing Propulsion Team; “This is the biggest, baddest crate engine we’ve ever built. The ZZ632 sits at the top of our unparalleled crate engine lineup as the king of performance. It delivers incredible power, and it does it on pump gas.”

The Big Block V-8 reaches peak power at 6,600 rpm, and revs to a recommended maximum of 7,000 rpm. Fuel is delivered through eight-port injectors, with the engine breathing through CNC-machined high-flow aluminum cylinder heads featuring symmetrical ports. While Big Blocks have usually been designed with variations in port shape from cylinder to cylinder, all eight intake ports of the ZZ632 have the same volume, length, and layout. Furthermore, all of the ZZ632's exhaust ports are identical. This arrangement guarantees all individual cylinders produce similar power.

These RS-X Symmetrical Port cylinder heads are named for powertrain engineer Ron Sperry, who designed them as one of his final accomplishments in more than 50 years working on General Motors performance and racing engines. Sperry also introduced symmetrical ports to Chevy's iconic Small Block V-8, with the Gen III LS1 engine that debuted in the 1997 Chevrolet Corvette.

The ZZ632's iron block shares a mold with Chevrolet Performance's ZZ572 crate engines, but the castings are machined to accommodate the huge 632 cubic-inch displacement. To provide clearance for that long-stroke, engineers modified both the block and the connecting rods. Four-bolt main caps and a forged rotating assembly assure strength and durability. During development, a single-engine endured more than 200 simulated drag strip passes on a dynamometer.

The ZZ632/1000 crate engine is slated to be on display at the 2021 SEMA Show in Las Vegas, November 2–5. Chevrolet Performance dealers will begin deliveries in early 2022.

Generation VI

Vortec 7400 (L29)
The Vortec 7400 L29  V8 was a truck version of the Chevrolet Big-Block engine. Introduced in 1996, it was produced for five years, until replaced by the Vortec 8100. Although introduced as the Vortec 7400 in 1996, it was basically a 454 Big-Block with a hydraulic roller cam, parts more suitable for use in light duty trucks, and more advanced technology. The engine had MPFI (multi-port fuel injection), which gave slightly more power and better fuel economy, and 2 valves per cylinder.

L29 Applications:
 1996–2000 Chevrolet/GMC C/K GMT-400 platform trucks 2500 and 3500
 1996–1999 Chevrolet Suburban 2500/GMC Suburban 2500 (option)
 1996–2000 Chevrolet Express 3/4 or 1 ton

Vortec 7400 (L21)
The Vortec 7400 L21 was a commercial version of the Chevrolet Big-Block engine used in the medium duty truck platform.  Its design shared much with the L29 454, but with the addition of forged pistons and crankshaft, and coil near plug ignition. It had slightly reduced power compared to the L29 454 and used a different PCM.  The L21 was paired with the early 4 speed Allison automatic transmission or manual transmission, depending on the application.

L21 Applications:
 1998–2001 Chevrolet Kodiak/GMC TopKick/Isuzu H-Series 4500 5500
 1998–2001 Kodiak/Topkick
 1998–2001 P12 HD Motorhome Chassis. The Workhorse W-20 is a clone of the P12 Chassis.

Generation VII

Vortec 8100 (L18)
The Vortec 8100 L18 is a big-block V8 engine primarily used as a truck engine. It was a redesigned Chevrolet big-block engine and was introduced with the 2001 full-size pickup trucks. It is an all-iron engine (block and heads) with two valves per cylinder.

Other important differences between the Vortec 8100 and older big-blocks include a changed firing order. The firing order of older big-block engines is 1-8-4-3-6-5-7-2 while Vortec 8100's firing order is 1-8-7-2-6-5-4-3. Other upgrades of Vortec 8100 include a new 18-bolt head bolt pattern, longer connecting rods, different symmetrical intake ports, different oil pan rails, and the use of metric threads throughout the engine. The fuel-injection system for the Vortec 8100 is nearly identical to that used on Gen III small block engines, right down to the fuel and spark tables in the ECU.

Vortec 8100s were built at GM's Tonawanda Engine plant while the engine block and cylinder head were cast at Saginaw Metal Casting Operations. The last L18 was manufactured in December 2009.

L18 Applications:

GM sold the Vortec 8100 to Workhorse (now a division of Navistar), making it one of the most popular engine choices in gas powered Class A motorhomes during the first decade of this century. GM stopped installing big-block V8s in the Silverado HD trucks when the GMT-800 series was discontinued in 2007.
 Chevrolet/GMC C3500HD 2001-2002
 Chevrolet Silverado/GMC Sierra 2500HD & 3500HD (option)
 Chevrolet Suburban/GMC Yukon XL 2500 (option)
 Chevrolet Express/GMC Savana 2500 & 3500
 Chevrolet Avalanche 2500 (std on GMT800 2500)
 Chevrolet Kodiak/GMC TopKick
 Workhorse Class A motorhomes.
 T-98 Kombat armored vehicles.
 U-Haul's  truck.
 Malibu Boats, e.g. Wakesetter.
 MasterCraft Boats

Aftermarket
Many custom engine builders across the United States, as well as a large variety of aftermarket components manufactured for the Big Block family, make it possible to build a complete Big Block engine that contains no Chevrolet components.

See also
From the 1950s through the 1970s, each GM division had its own V8 engine family. Many were shared with other divisions, but each design is most closely associated with its own division:
 Buick V8 engine
 Cadillac V8 engine
 Chevrolet Small-Block engine
 GMC V8 engine
 Oldsmobile V8 engine
 Pontiac V8 engine
 Holden V8 engine

GM later standardized on the later generations of the Chevrolet design:
 GM LT engine—Generation II small-block
 GM LS engine—Generation III/IV small-block
 List of GM engines

Competitors' equivalent offerings:
 Chrysler B engine - wedge
 Chrysler Hemi engine - hemi
 Ford 385 engine - big block
 Ford FE engine - medium block
 AMC V8 engine - medium block

Footnotes

Citations

Further reading
 

Big-Block
V8 engines
Gasoline engines by model
Engines by model